The use of unmanned aerial vehicles (UAVs) or drones, is generally regulated by the civil aviation authority of the country. Nevertheless, the International Civil Aviation Organization (ICAO) began exploring the use of drone technology as far back as 2005, which resulted in a 2011 report. France was among the first countries to set a national framework based on this report and larger aviation bodies such as the FAA and the EASA quickly followed suit, which eventually led to influential regulations such as Part 107 and Regulation (EU) 2019/947. As of January 2022, several countries are working on new regulations, ranging from BVLOS (beyond visual line of sight, or BLOS) operations to UTM (unmanned traffic management) activities, which include the US, the EU, India, South Korea, Japan, and Australia among others.

Certification aspects
One of the main barriers to rapid full-scale growth of commercial unmanned aircraft is the concern for safety. As myriad certification agencies scramble to keep up with the unique demands of this fast-growing industry, one thing is clear – where applicable, pertinent certification standards for manned aircraft are starting to apply. For the complex electronics that provide communication and control of these systems, this means a swift move towards compliance with DO-178C and DO-254 for software and hardware development.

In most cases, the unmanned aircraft (UA) can only be operated as part of a system, hence the term “unmanned aircraft system” (UAS). The UAS consists of an UA, a remote pilot station and the command, control and communications links that join them; as such, safety considerations address all of these elements.

In 2011, the International Civil Aviation Organization (ICAO) of the United Nations published Circular 328, which states that a UAS should demonstrate equivalent levels of safety as manned aircraft and thus meet relevant government rules for flight and flight equipment.
The ICAO further distinguishes between autonomous aircraft and remotely-piloted aircraft (RPA), and anticipates that only RPA "will be able to integrate into the international civil aviation system in the foreseeable future".

The year 2021 was a rather influential year for drone regulation for the drone industry given the regulations that would finally enter into force. Starting on December 31, 2020, new regulations took effect in the European Union whereby the first step for a drone operator/ remote pilot would be to register in the country in which they live, or have their main place of business. EASA also issued guidelines for the management of drone incidents at airports and rules for air traffic management would also kick in as of July 1, 2021. Meanwhile, the FAA announced new rules for remote identification, and operations over people.

By country or region
The European Union sees benefits and challenges for civilian drones, and in 2014 proposed a set of regulations to control the effects of drones on peoples' safety, security and privacy.

Unmanned Aircraft Systems (UAS) Advisory Group was set up in 2015 by the United Nations’ civil aviation arm to draw up global rules and regulations for the safe use of unmanned aircraft. 
The team comprises countries such as the United States, France and China, as well as industry bodies like the global pilots' association.

In December 2017, the International Air Transport Association (IATA), a global airline trade body, pressed governments to ensure enforcement of regulations to curb reckless and dangerous flying of recreational drones.

Australia

CASA regulations require that UAVs be at least 30m from people and shouldn't be operated in a way that creates a hazard.

Brazil

In 2017, the National Civil Aviation Agency regulated the operation of drones through the Brazilian Special Civil Aviation Regulation No. 94/2017 (RBAC-E No. 94/2017). ANAC's regulation complements the drone operating rules established by the Airspace Control Department (DECEA) and the National Telecommunications Agency (ANATEL).

Canada
In 2016 Transport Canada proposed the implementation of new regulations that would require all drones over 250 grams to be registered and insured and that operators would be required to be a minimum age and pass an exam in order to get a license. These regulations were introduced in 2019.

France
Overflights of nuclear power plants are illegal in France, with a punishment of a year in prison and a fine of €75,000 if an aircraft comes within 5 km horizontally or 1 km vertically of a plant.

Hong Kong
While no-fly zones have been declared in Victoria Harbour, country parks, the airport, military sites, prisons and in government-run leisure facilities, it was reported that rules were rarely enforced or observed. The Hong Kong government is proposing to introduce regulations that will broadly follow American standards, which might require all drones above a certain weight to be registered. Information would then made available to law enforcement authorities, and failure to register and tag a drone could be punishable by a US$250,000 (HK$1.95 million) fine or up to three years in jail. A short public consultation on the matter is set to be conducted by the first quarter of 2018, and to finish by mid-2018.

India 
Permission from WPC is required for importing any radio controlled equipments in India, including drones/UAV. Drones imported into India, without prior permission from WPC and DGCA, will be confiscated by Customs at point of entry. Drones above 2 kg also requires Air Defense clearance(Flight permit); and drone pilot who is least 18 years old, and has completed the 'drone pilot training'.

DGCA has on August 27, 2018, issued finalised drone guidelines. The regulations come into force from December 1, 2018. Under the regulations, drones are restricted items and cannot be carried in hand baggage. All drone operations are restricted to daylight and within visual line of sight. However, shooting in well-lit enclosed premises using micro drone up to 200 ft is permitted even after sunset. An Industry association has also been formed National Association of Drone Developers & Space Organizations (NADDSO) for making policy framework of drone usages in various sectors specially in Defense and Agriculture in India.

Indonesia 
In 2015, the Indonesian Ministry of Transportation's Directorate General of Civil Aviation published a rule that regulates the usage of Unmanned Aerial Vehicles in the Indonesian Airspace. The rule states that UAVs should not fly above the altitude of 150m and should not fly inside restricted or prohibited area, and areas around airports. UAVs that require altitudes higher than 150m would require a written authorization from the Directorate General of Civil Aviation. Additionally, UAVs equipped with imaging equipment should not fly within 500m from the border of restricted or prohibited area, and if the UAV is involved in imaging activities, the operator should have written permission from the local government. Special UAVs equipped with farming equipment such as seed spreader or insecticide spray should only operate in farmland, and should not operate within 500m of housing area.

Instead of NFZ (No-fly zone) and No-Drone Zone (Airspace around airport at radius of 5 miles), there is a local regulation called KKOP (Kawasan Keselamatan Operasi Penerbangan). Refer to one of Indonesian Remote Pilot Certified and Activist, Arya Dega, the KKOP is a UAV restricted area that not included in NDZ or NFZ. I.e.: Presidencial Palace, Government Building, some of Hospital, and Military Facility.

Japan
On 11 September 2015, an amendment to the Aeronautical Act was issued to introduce safety rules on unmanned aircraft (UA)/drones. The new regulations came into effect on 10 December 2015. According to the Civil Aviation Bureau in Japan, the term “UA/drone”s refers to any airplane, rotorcraft, glider or airship which cannot accommodate any person on board and can be remotely or automatically piloted (excluding those lighter than 200 grams, inclusive of the battery weight.)

Any person who intends to operate a UA/drones in the following airspace is required to obtain special permission from the Minister of Land, Infrastructure, Transport and Tourism. 
 
(A) All airspace above or around airports, heliports and aerodromes. (airspace above the OLS, obstacle limitation surfaces.)
(B) All airspace 150 meters above ground/water surface.
(C) All airspace above Densely Inhabited Districts (DID), which are defined and published by the Ministry of Internal Affairs and Communications. (i.e. urban area and suburb, so only rural area is allowed)

When no permission is required from the minister, or obtained permission by extremely troublesome procedures, anyone should operate UA/drones in the daytime and within Visual Line of Sight (VLOS). Video telecontrol or automated flight is prohibited. A 30-meters operating distance have to be maintained between the UA/drones and persons or properties on the ground/water surface. UA/drones should not be operated over event sites where many people gather. UA/drones should not carry hazardous materials such as combustible or explosives (except one for power source). Objects should not be dropped off from UA/drones other than touching down the ground. These restrictions can be granted by special permission from the minister.

Furthermore, for security reasons, anyone cannot levitate any flying object including UA/drones, aeroballoons, gliders, flyboards and jet packs within about 300 meters from the National Diet Building, the official residents of speakers of the House of Representatives and the House of Councillors, the Prime Minister's Official Residence, the Kasumigasekis, the Supreme court, Tokyo Imperial Palace (including Akasaka Imperial Residences), the main offices of political parties, the diplomatic mission offices, nuclear power plants and other nuclear facilities, as well as buildings used for inter-governmental political forum such as Group of Seven temporarily.

UA/drones will be radio-controlled, so one should follow the Japan Radio Act exactly.

Flying UA/drones above some parks, coasts and ports including Tottori Sand Dunes is restricted by the by-laws in some prefectures of Japan. Like many other countries, it is a kind of trespass to fly UA/drones indoors, near above the dwellings, or near above its surrounding soil without the permission of a person with legitimate rights.

Malaysia
Any person in charge of a small unmanned aircraft with a mass of 20 kilograms or less may fly the aircraft without approval from the Department of Civil Aviation Malaysia as long as “he is satisfied that the flight can safely be made”.

Myanmar
In November 2017, Myanmar sentenced three journalists and their driver to two months’ imprisonment for operating a drone near parliament while shooting a documentary. While Myanmar has no specific law on drones, individual authorities have tried to restrict the use of such equipment over their premises.

The Philippines
In 2015, the Civil Aviation Authority of the Philippines (CAAP) announced that owners or operators of unmanned aircraft vehicles (UAVs) who will operate the drones for commercial purposes must register with the CAAP, and secure a certification. Commercial uses include filming, aerial mapping, surveying and other revenue purposes.

For operations specifically for model, sports, hobby and recreational activities, authorisation from the CAAP is not required. 
All operations of UAVs in Philippine airspace have to comply with the general guidelines stated in Philippine Civil Aviation Regulations Part 11.11.1.2 (General UAV Operations).

The UAV must be flown:
 30 meters beyond a person who is not directly associated with the operation of the UAV;
 An altitude not exceeding 400 feet Above Ground Level (AGL);
 Outside 10 km radius from the Aerodrome Reference Point (ARP); and
 The UAV shall stay clear of populated area unless an approval from the CAAP has been granted.

Republic of Ireland 

In 2012, the Irish Aviation Authority published a document setting out safety requirements for any unmanned aerial system.  The IAA policy is that unmanned aerial systems may not be flown without the operator receiving a specific permission from the IAA. New regulations, including a registry of UAVs over 1 kg were introduced in December 2015.

Singapore 

In Singapore, laws were passed in Parliament in May 2015 to allay concerns over safety, security and privacy surrounding unmanned aerial vehicles (UAVs). The Unmanned Aircraft (Public Safety and Security) Bill outlines regulations for the safe flying of drones and enforcement action against errant users. For instance, permits are required to fly drones above 7 kg, or within a 5 km radius of an aerodrome.

Before conducting any outdoor activities, operators should ensure that the UA is flown within the permitted areas. The Civil Aviation Authority of Singapore (CAAS) website provides a map delineating prohibited areas, danger and restricted areas, areas within 5 km of an airport or an airbase and protected areas.

In general, permits are not required for recreational or research uses of UA in Singapore, as long as the operation of the UA is in line with CAAS’ operating conditions.

Situations where recreational or research uses of UA require a permit are when:

 The total mass of UA including payload exceeds 7 kg (Operator permit and Class 1 Activity Permit required)
 UA is flown higher than 200 feet above mean sea level (Class 2 Activity Permit required)
 Within restricted, danger, protected, prohibited areas and within 5 km of an aerodrome / airbase (Class 2 Activity Permit required)

Regardless of UA weight or location of UA operations, an operator permit and a Class 1 Activity Permit is required for operations that are non-recreational or non-research in nature. The permit application form can be found on the CAAS website.

Depending on the nature of the flight or UA used, other possible permits that may be required from other agencies include:
Singapore Police Force (SPF) for aerial photography and/or overflight of security-sensitive locations
Info-communications Media Development Authority (IMDA) of Singapore for use of radio frequencies and power limits other than in IMDA's guidelines for short range devices.

From February 1, 2021, anyone using a UAV needs to obtain an unmanned aircraft basic training certificate (UABTC) or unmanned aircraft pilot licence (UAPL). Without a UABTC, UAPL, activity/operator permit during checks by Civil Aviation Authority of Singapore enforcement officers, he or she can face S$20,000 for their first offence. Repeat offenders face a fine of up to S$40,000 and/or up to 15 months’ jail.

South Africa 
In April 2014, the South African Civil Aviation Authority announced that it would clamp down on the illegal flying of UAVs in South African airspace. They also stated that as they had not authorised any such flights, existing ones were being done illegally. A growth in the use of UAVs had prompted the SACAA to integrate them into South African airspace, but until regulations were in place, people operating them could be fined up to R50,000 and face up to 10 years prison.

Following discussions between the South African Civil Aviation Authority and key role players such as operators, manufacturers and other airspace users, a set of draft regulations were submitted to the Minister of Transport for review and approval. The regulations were accepted by Dipuo Peters, the South African transport minister, and put into effect 1 July 2015. The regulations are called the Eighth Amendment of the South African Civil Aviation Regulations, 2015 

The new regulations focus strongly on safety aspects with UAVs not being allowed to fly higher than 120m or closer than 50 meters to a person or group of people without prior approval from the SACAA.

Airspace restrictions also apply above and adjacent to:

 Nuclear plants
 Prisons
 Police stations
 Crime scenes
 Court of law
 National key points

Manned aircraft always have the right of way and the passing of UAVs close to such aircraft are strictly prohibited. Pilots are required to tune into the air traffic services in which they are flying and all flight activity are required to be recorded in a logbook. Public roads may also not be used for take-off and landing.

Another safety aspect prohibits UAVs to be used in adverse weather conditions where visibility will be impaired. Separate approval is required where line of sight is unmanageable or for night flying.

Current regulations do not allow UAVs to be used for deliveries or for the transportation of goods. From a hobbyist point of view UAVs cannot tow other aircraft, perform aerobatic and aerial displays or be flown in a formation.

UAV pilots are required to have a CAA approved and valid pilot licence and a letter of approval which is valid for 12 months. Any incidents should be reported to the relevant authorities, especially if serious damage or injury was caused.

South Korea
Under the local law as of 2016, drones are banned from many places in the country, especially from the northern parts of Seoul, where key government offices are clustered. Areas around military installations and nuclear power plants are also no-fly zones.

Thailand
All type of drones, except toy drones that are under 250 grams, have to be registered with the Civil Aviation Authority. The regulations cover nearly all forms of drone use from commercial and recreational to scientific. Drone users who failed to register their drones by 9 January 2018 could face up to five years in jail or a 100,000 baht (US$3100) fine.

United Kingdom

In August 2012, The U.K.'s Civil Aviation Authority (CAA) stated that it will require non-military drones larger than 20 kg to be able to automatically sense other aircraft and steer to avoid them.

As of 2013, the CAA rules are that UAV aircraft less than 20 kilograms in weight must be in direct visual contact with the pilot, cannot fly within 150 meters of a congested area or within 50 meters of a person or vehicle, and cannot be used for commercial activity.

In July 2018, the CAA rules were updated to make it against the law to fly above  and to make it against the law to fly your drone within  of an airport or airfield boundary.

On February 20, 2019, The Department for Transport announced a new legislation to extend the ‘no-fly’ zone around airports, banning drones from flying within  of runways.

Owners of drones and model aircraft are required to register their drone and obtain an 'Operator ID' and 'Flyer ID', all of which can be obtained by taking and passing an online theory test provided by the CAA. Children and teenagers under the age of 18 are not authorised to register a UAV, nor hold an Operator ID, but can receive a Flyer ID for a UAV owned by their parents or legal guardian by passing the same theory test. Operator IDs must be renewed each year, while Flyer IDs last for three years. Once a drone or model aircraft is registered and its operator passes the theory test, the owner's Operator ID must be displayed when in operation.

United States

The US Federal Aviation Administration has adopted the name unmanned aircraft (UA) to describe aircraft systems without a flight crew on board. To operate a UA for non-recreational purposes in the United States, according to the FAA users must obtain a Certificate of Authorization to operate in national airspace. The FAA may permit the use of UAs for commercial or business purposes in response to individual exemption requests.

Within the United States, the Congress passed a bill in 2012 that mandated the FAA create a plan for allowing UAS into commercial airspace. Subsequently, the FAA issued “the Integration of Civil Unmanned Aircraft Systems (UAS) in the National Airspace System (NAS) Roadmap”.

, obtaining an experimental airworthiness certificate for a particular UAS is the only way civil operators of unmanned aircraft are accessing the National Airspace System of the United States. FAA Order 8130.34, Airworthiness Certification of Unmanned Aircraft Systems, establishes procedures for issuing this certification, and as such establishes guidance standards for certification aspects of development and operation, which may be addressed by adoption of such standards as ARP4754A, and DO-178C.

The FAA roadmap is, in essence, maturation of the acceptance of UAVs from this “experimental” aircraft certification to requiring the same standard airworthiness type certification of manufacturing design as is now required of conventional manned aircraft.

In December 2015 the FAA announced that all UAVs weighing more than 250 grams flown for any purpose must be registered with the FAA.  The FAA's Interim Rule can be accessed here. This regulation goes into effect on December 21, 2015, and requires that hobby type UAV's between 250 grams and 55 pounds need to be registered no later than February 19, 2016. The FAA's registration portal for drones can be accessed here.

Notable requirements of the new FAA UAV registration process include:
 Effective December 21, 2015, if the UAV has never been operated in U.S. airspace (i.e. its first flight outside), eligible owners must register their UAV's prior to flight. If the UAV previously operated in U.S. airspace, it must be registered by February 19, 2016.
 In order to use the registration portal, you must be 13 years of age or older. If the owner is less than 13 years old, then a parent or other responsible person must do the FAA registration.
 Each registrant will receive a certificate of aircraft registration and a registration number and all UAV's must be marked with the FAA issued registration number.
 The FAA registration requires a $5 fee, though the FAA is waiving the fee for the first 30 days of the new registration period - until January 20, 2016. The registration is good for 3 years, but can be renewed for an additional 3 years at the $5 rate.

The new FAA rule provides that a single registration applies to as many UAVs as an owner/operator owns or operates. Failure to register can result in civil penalties of up to $27,500, and criminal penalties which could include fines up to $250,000 and/or imprisonment for up to three years.

To show problems with the FAA process, in August, 2015 an attorney was able to get FAA approval for a commercial drone that was actually a battery powered paper airplane toy. It is too underpowered to carry a camera. The December 2015 registration specifically excludes paper airplanes, Frisbees, and other flying objects that are not true UAVs.

In addition to FAA certification, the regulation of usage of UA systems by government authorities in the United States for law enforcement purposes is determined at a state level.

In 2021, the FAA officially published and put into effect Remote ID regulations, officially requiring all drones above 250g in mass and all drones flown for commercial purposes to have a digital license plate which, in real time, publicly transmits the location of both the drone and the operator (in most cases). Within the first half of 2021, RaceDayQuads v. FAA was filed, challenging the law in US Federal Court, with RaceDayQuads founder primarily claiming the law allows for the invasion of privacy to drone operators, opens them up to the profiting of their activity by security companies, and would increase harassment of UAV operators.

Uruguay
In 2014, the government regulated UAVs. Machines under 25 kg do not require any operating licence, and have a maximum flight altitude of 120 meters within visual line of sight. Machines up to 260 kg must be registered, require an operator permit, and may have above 120 meters with permission from air traffic control. Machines above 260 kg are classified as aircraft, and require a full pilot licence.

See also

References

External links
 UK CAA Regulations and Overview
 South African Civil Aviation Authority
 Civil Aviation Association of Singapore

 
UAV